This is the filmography of Telugu film actor Ali.

Telugu films

As a supporting actor

As a lead actor

As child artist

As dubbing artist

Tamil films

Kannada films

Hindi films

Television

References 

Male actor filmographies
Indian filmographies